Annals of Pediatric Cardiology is a peer-reviewed open-access medical journal published on behalf of the Pediatric Cardiology Society of India. The journal publishes articles on the subjects of pediatric cardiology, cardiac surgery, cardiac pathology, cardiac anesthesia, pediatric intensive care, and cardiac imaging. It is indexed with Caspur, CINAHL, DOAJ, EBSCO, Excerpta Medica/EMBASE, Expanded Academic ASAP, JournalSeek, Google Scholar, Health & Wellness Research Center, Health Reference Center Academic, Hinari, Index Copernicus, Indian Science Abstracts, OpenJGate, PubMed, SCOLOAR, SIIC databases, and Ulrich's Periodicals Directory.

External links 
 

Open access journals
English-language journals
Biannual journals
Cardiology journals
Publications established in 2008
Medknow Publications academic journals
Pediatrics in India
Academic journals associated with learned and professional societies